Lady Eleanor Palmer née Ambrose (1718/20–1818) was a celebrated beauty and Catholic heiress. Her father, Michael, was well-educated but disbarred from several professions by his religion. He became a brewer and made his fortune. He resided at Mount Ambrose, Swords, County Dublin.

Eleanor was described as "beautiful, witty, intellectual and a fevent patriot" who "managed to penetrate Dublin society, despite the fact that she was a Catholic. Indeed, she became a darling of the Viceregal Court, and during the Viceroyalty of Lord Chesterfield, she and her sister Clara were the prominent socialites of the Castle set. Chesterfield was attracted to her, and she soon accompanied him to all official ceremonies. Influenced by her opinions, Chesterfield is reported to have told George II that poverty not Popery was to be feared in Ireland, he had found only one dangerous papist, the brightness of whose eyes and charms, and whose conversation were indeed dangerous, and her name was Eleanor Ambrose".

However, Eleanor ensured the relationship stayed platonic.

In 1752 she married Roger Palmer of Castle Lackin, County Mayo (created baronet 1777) and had issue. She died at her house on Henry Street, Dublin, in 1816, "retaining to the last a vehement hatred of the wrongs under which her Catholic fellow-countrymen laboured."

A song written about her story by Aido Lawlor - from Rush North Co Dublin - was recorded by the singer Aoife Scott on her 2016 album Carry the Day.

See also
 Palmer Baronets
 Mary Barber

References

External links
 http://catalogue.nli.ie/Record/vtls000301263

1718 births
1816 deaths
18th-century Irish people
19th-century Irish people
18th-century Irish women
People from Swords, Dublin
19th-century Irish women
Wives of baronets